Haina is a village and a former municipality in the district of Gotha, in Thuringia, Germany. Since 1 January 2019, it is part of the municipality Nessetal.

References

Gotha (district)
Saxe-Coburg and Gotha
Former municipalities in Thuringia